The Ovitz family was a family of Hungarian Jewish actors/traveling musicians originating from present Romania, who survived imprisonment at the Auschwitz concentration camp during World War II. Most of them were dwarfs. They were the largest family of dwarfs ever recorded and were the largest family to enter Auschwitz and survive intact; the family of twelve ranged from a 15-month-old baby to a 58-year-old woman.

Origin
The Ovitz family originated from Maramureș County, Romania. They were descended from Shimson Eizik Ovitz (1868–1923), a badchen entertainer, itinerant rabbi and himself a dwarf. He fathered ten children in total, seven of them dwarfs (born with pseudoachondroplasia), from two marriages.

The children from his first marriage to Brana Fruchter (she was of average height), Rozika (1886–1984) and Franzika (1889–1980), were both dwarfs. Shimson's second wife, Batia Bertha Husz, also of average height, produced the following children: Avram (1903–1972; dwarf), Freida (1905–1975; dwarf), Sarah (1907–1993; average height), Micki (1909–1972; dwarf), Leah (1911-1987; average height), Elizabeth (1914–1992; dwarf), Arie (1917–1944; average height), and Piroska (a.k.a. "Perla"; 1921–2001; dwarf).

Lilliput Troupe

The children founded their own ensemble, the Lilliput Troupe. They sang and played music using small instruments and performed all over Romania, Hungary and Czechoslovakia in the 1930s and 1940s. The taller relatives helped backstage. The Ovitzes sang in Yiddish, Hungarian, Romanian, Russian and German. When they were not touring, they lived in a single house with their spouses.

At the start of World War II, there were 12 family members, seven of them dwarfs. When Hungary seized Northern Transylvania in September 1940, the new racial laws banned Jewish artists from entertaining non-Jews. Though the Ovitzes were observant Jews, they obtained papers which omitted the fact that they were Jewish and continued going on their tours until 1944. On 12 May 1944, all twelve family members were deported to Auschwitz. One average sized brother, Arie, escaped the round up but was later arrested and executed in 1944.

Auschwitz
Once in the camp, the Ovitzes attracted the attention of the German camp doctor Josef Mengele (known as the Angel of Death), who collected curiosities for pseudoscientific experiments on heredity. He separated the Ovitzes from the rest of the camp inmates to add them to his collection of test subjects. He was curious about the fact that the family included both dwarfs and taller members. Eleven other prisoners claimed to be their relatives, and Mengele moved all of them accordingly.

Mengele arranged to have special living quarters built for them, so they could be monitored. To keep them healthy for his human experimentation, he arranged for them to have more hygienic living conditions, better food and their own bedclothes. Mengele allowed them to keep their own clothes, and forced the taller members of the group to carry the dwarfs to the experimentation sites. The family were told that they were to put on a show for the SS guards at their huge canteen. When they arrived Mengele had them strip whilst he spoke about his own ideas about genetics.

The Ovitzes—like many other camp inmates—were subjected to various tests. Mengele's physicians extracted bone marrow and pulled out teeth and hair to find signs of hereditary disease. They poured hot and cold water in their ears and blinded them with chemical drops. Gynecologists inspected the married women.

Eighteen-month-old Shimshon Ovitz was put through the worst ordeals because he had taller parents and was prematurely born; Mengele drew blood from the veins behind his ears and from his fingers on a daily basis often causing weakness. The Ovitzes also witnessed two newcomer dwarfs being killed and boiled so their bones could be exhibited in a museum. Mengele also filmed them; this film was not found after the war, and it is possible that he kept it when he fled.

They expected to be killed after Mengele had finished his experiments, but they lived to see the liberation of Auschwitz on 27 January 1945. The Red Army took them to the Soviet Union where they lived in a refugee camp for some time before they were released.

Aftermath

The Ovitzes traveled on foot for seven months to their home village. They found their home looted and moved, first to the town of Sighet and later to Belgium. In May 1949 they immigrated to Israel, settled in Haifa, and began their tours again, being quite successful and packing large concert halls. In 1955 they retired and bought a cinema hall.

Descendants of the dwarf men of the family were born taller; the women did not become pregnant due to their small pelvises. The firstborn of the dwarfs, Rozika Ovitz, died in 1984 at the age of 98. The last adult dwarf survivor of the family, Perla Ovitz, died in 2001.

Media
In March 2013, Warwick Davis presented an episode of the ITV series Perspectives, entitled "Warwick Davis – The Seven Dwarfs of Auschwitz". He explored the story of the Ovitz family, including an interview with Perla Ovitz recorded in 1999 recounting how they survived the Nazi concentration camp of Auschwitz and Mengele's experiments. The interview from the film comes from a documentary, Liebe Perla (German for "Dear Perla").

A fictional version of the family and the cinema in Haifa that they ran is featured in the 2010 Israeli film The Matchmaker.

See also
 Alexander Katan

Publications

References

External links
Standing Tall at Auschwitz (a 2006 documentary film about the Ovitz family)
Liebe Perla (a 1999 documentary film, Israel)

Jewish-Hungarian families
20th-century Israeli actors
Israeli families
Israeli musical groups
Nazi eugenics
Actors with dwarfism
People from Maramureș County
Romanian families
Romanian Jews
Romanian singers
Badchens
Romanian people of World War II
Auschwitz concentration camp survivors
20th-century Romanian actors
Romanian stage actors